Călărășeuca (also Călărașeuca or Calarașovca) is a commune in Ocnița District, Moldova. It is composed of two villages, Berezovca and Calarășeuca. The term literally means "place of călărași"; see Călărași for etymology.

A monument dedicated to Polish Grand Hetman Stanisław Żółkiewski is located in Berezovca village. It is a venue for events organized by the Polish minority in Moldova.

See also
Călărășeuca Stadium

Notes

Communes of Ocnița District
Populated places on the Dniester